Romina Pourmokhtari (born 12 November 1995) is a Swedish politician for the Liberals. She has served as the Minister for the Environment since 2022 in the Kristersson Cabinet. She has also been a member of the Riksdag for Stockholm Municipality since 2022. She is the youngest-ever minister of a cabinet in Sweden, ascending her position at the age of 26.

Political career 
Pourmokhtari became the president of the Liberal Youth of Sweden in 2019. On 14 September 2022, she announced that she will step down as president at the upcoming congress in November.

Personal life 
Pourmokhtari grew up in Sundbyberg. Her father is a political refugee from Iran, and it was through him that Romina became interested in politics. According to Pourmokhtari, her parents fled from the country "when freedom was taken from them." During her interview with the Swedish newspaper NU – Det liberala Nyhetsmagasinet, she stated that her first strong political memory was during the 2009 Iranian presidential election protests.

In 2022, Pourmokhtari was named "Sweden's most powerful politician under 30" by Expressen.

References

1995 births
Living people
21st-century Swedish politicians
21st-century Swedish women politicians
Members of the Riksdag from the Liberals (Sweden)
Members of the Riksdag 2022–2026
Swedish Ministers for the Environment
Swedish politicians of Iranian descent
Women members of the Riksdag
Women government ministers of Sweden